Trolls Holiday is a 2017 Christmas special that premiered on NBC on November 24, 2017. Based on the film Trolls, the half-hour Christmas special was directed by Joel Crawford and produced by DreamWorks Animation. The main cast all reprised their roles as their respective characters, most notably Anna Kendrick, Justin Timberlake, and Zooey Deschanel as Poppy, Branch, and Bridget, respectively. Another special with the same theme, but with another plot, Trolls: Holiday in Harmony, aired on November 26, 2021 on NBC.

Plot
After the Bergen Town tradition of eating Trolls on Trollstice is cancelled, the Bergens have no holidays left to celebrate. Poppy, who has received numerous cards from the Bergens celebrating different days of the week or times of day, decides to share Troll holidays with the Bergens. She enlists the Snack Pack and her friend Branch, unfamiliar with being happy, to head to Bergen Town on a bus driven by Cloud Guy. Upon traveling through a strange wormhole, the Trolls arrive in Bergen Town.

The Trolls show Queen Bridget and King Gristle their holiday traditions, but the spectacle overwhelms the Bergens. Bridget, exasperated by the spectacle, tells Poppy to leave and give them some space. Heartbroken, Poppy departs Bergen Town for the forest with her friends in pursuit. Poppy tells Branch of her fear that she might have lost Bridget's friendship forever. Branch tries to cheer her up by singing songs pointing out where she went wrong. Meanwhile, back in Bergen Town, Bridget and Gristle start to regret how hard they both were on the Trolls, and Bridget acknowledges that Poppy cares about the Bergens.

Poppy soon realizes that she was so busy trying to celebrate with the Bergens that she was not listening to Bridget's needs. When Poppy and Branch return to Bergen Town, they find that the entire town is decorated with decorations made by the Bergens. Poppy and Bridget apologize to each other, and Branch finally cracks a smile, to Poppy and Bridget’s delight. The Bergens and the Trolls all celebrate their new holiday, Troll-A-Bration, together.

Cast 
 Anna Kendrick as Queen Poppy, the sweet and optimistic Queen of the Trolls.
 Justin Timberlake as Branch, an over-cautious, but good-hearted survivalist Troll who is dislikes Christmas.
 Zooey Deschanel as Queen Bridget, a former scullery maid who befriended the Trolls and became Queen of the Bergens.
 Christopher Mintz-Plasse as King Gristle Jr., the King of the Bergens.
 James Corden as Biggie, a large, friendly Troll and the owner of Mr. Dinkles.
 Ron Funches as Cooper, a hip giraffe-like Troll.
 Kunal Nayyar as Guy Diamond, a glittery, naked Troll with a highly auto-tuned voice.
 Icona Pop as Satin and Chenille, twin fashionista Trolls who are conjoined by their hair.
 Walt Dohrn as:
 Smidge, a small, inordinately strong female Troll with a masculine voice.
 Fuzzbert, a Troll whose legs are the only thing visible beside his hair.
 Cloud Guy, an eccentric anthropomorphic cloud.  
 Curtis Stone as Todd, a royal guard that works for the Bergen Royal Family.
 Mike Mitchell as Chad, a royal guard that works for the Bergen Royal Family.
 Kevin Michael Richardson as Mr. Dinkles, Biggie's pet worm and the narrator of the special.

Soundtrack
A soundtrack featuring seven songs from the special was released on October 27, 2017 by RCA Records.

Charts

Release
The special premiered on NBC on November 24, 2017 (Black Friday).

Ratings
The premiere of Trolls Holiday attracted 5.36 million viewers, with a 1.5 in the 18-49 demographic. It is the second most watched program of the night, behind How the Grinch Stole Christmas!, with 5.78 million viewers.

Home media
Trolls Holiday was released on DVD on November 28, 2017 by Universal Pictures Home Entertainment, making it the first DreamWorks Animation DVD release to be distributed by said company, and in turn, the first Universal-distributed DreamWorks production. It was streamed to Netflix on December 6. Select episodes of other DreamWorks television series (i.e. Home: Adventures with Tip and Oh and Spirit Riding Free) accompanied the special on the DVD while an episode of Dawn of the Croods accompanied the special's digital release, replacing the Spirit episode. In 2019, it was released on Blu-Ray for the first time in the US, featured on The Ultimate Holiday Collection box set, which also included various DreamWorks holiday specials as well as Rise of the Guardians. It was then re-released on Blu-Ray and DVD in a 2-movie box set alongside Trolls: Holiday in Harmony by Studio Distribution Services LLC (a joint-ventured company between Universal Pictures Home Entertainment and Warner Bros. Home Entertainment).

References

External links
Official website

2017 television specials
2010s American television specials
DreamWorks Animation animated short films
Trolls (franchise)
Christmas television specials
Musical television specials
NBC television specials
2010s American animated films
American Christmas television specials
2010s animated television specials
Films directed by Joel Crawford